Tsend Mönkh-Orgil or Tsendiin Mönkh-Orgil (born 18 October 1964) is a Mongolian politician and a member of the State Great Hural. He is also the first person from Mongolia to join the United Nations International Law Commission as a member. 

Mönkh-Orgil previously served as the Foreign Minister of Mongolia from 2004 to 2006 and from 2016 to 2017. Additionally, he served as the Minister of Justice and Internal Affairs from 2007 to 2008.

Early life and education
Mönkh-Orgil was born to a family of doctors in the town of Baruun-Urt, Sukhbaatar Province, on 18 October 1964. As his parents' work commission ended in 1968, they moved to Ulaanbaatar, where he completed his secondary education at the 23rd school. As a kid, Mönkh-Orgil dreamed of becoming a pilot, architect, and a journalist. At the end of his 10th grade, as he started to actively read Ünen, a Mongolian daily newspaper, as well as Russian newspapers, he developed an interest in international relations, and decided to pursue a higher education in the field. 

He received a bachelor's degree from the Faculty of International Law at the Moscow State Institute of International Relations in 1988, and earned a master's degree from Harvard Law School in 1996. He engaged in postgraduate studies at the John F. Kennedy School of Government in 2001.

In 1982, the year before he went to study in Moscow, Mönkh-Orgil was drafted into the army and served in the 282nd Unit of the Mongolian People's Army.

Diplomatic career 
Mönkh-Orgil joined Foreign Ministry of Mongolia in 1988 and worked there as a Diplomatic Officer until 1991. He was also a Diplomatic Officer at the Permanent Mission of Mongolia to the United Nations in New York from 1991 to 1995.  

Throughout his diplomatic career, Mönkh-Orgil acted as the head or member of the Mongolian delegations to numerous international conferences including the UN General Assembly, the Conference on Disarmament, and the Human Rights Council. 

In November 2021, Mönkh-Orgil was elected as a member of the United Nations International Law Commission at the 76th session of the UN General Assembly.

Political career
Mönkh-Orgil started his political career in 2000, when he joined the Mongolian People's Party (MPP) as a member of its Governing Conference. He acted as a member in the party's Governing Council (executive body) during 2004-2008, 2012-2014, and has been a member since 2021. He was also secretary of the MPP in charge of the capital city of Ulaanbaatar from 2012 to 2014.

Furthermore, Mönkh-Orgil was elected as a member of the State Great Khural a total of 4 times, in 2004, 2008, 2016, and 2020. As a member of the parliament, he has drafted and co-drafted many pieces of legislation including civil, criminal, customs, corporate, labor, and land codes, and laws related to elections, political parties, anti-corruption, and anti-money laundering.

In 2000 and 2007, Mönkh-Orgil was appointed as the Deputy Minister and the Minister for Justice and Internal Affairs of Mongolia respectively.

In 2004 and 2016, Mönkh-Orgil was appointed as the Foreign Minister of Mongolia. As the foreign minister, he focused on improving foreign trade and economic relations, easing trade process, and providing comfortable legal environment for foreign investors and business owners. Also, he made statements about the need to consolidate Mongolia's budgets.

During the merger process of the MPP and the Mongolian People's Revolutionary Party, which took place from 2020 to 2021, Mönkh-Orgil was a member of the team responsible for negotiating and managing the process.

Mönkh-Orgil is currently the Chairman of the Mongolian People's Party Working Group on Human Resources Development and Management Policy Paper.

Legal career 
From 1996 to 2000, Mönkh-Orgil acted as an attorney-at-law in private law firms in the Washington, D.C. and Ulaanbaatar, Mongolia. He also acted as a counsel and advisor to the Government of Mongolia in numerous litigations in domestic and international courts, as well as arbitrations and foreign investment negotiations. His expertise on law and legal matters helped him win court cases on behalf of the Mongolian Government, such as the "Marubeni Case".

Personal life 
Mönkh-Orgil is married and has three children. He has been a member of the New York State Bar Association since 1996. He joined the Mongolian National Olympic Committee as a member in 2017.

In 2017, Mönkh-Orgil was awarded the diplomatic title of Ambassador Extraordinary and Plenipotentiary by the Decree of the President of Mongolia.

In addition to his native Mongolian, Mönkh-Orgil is fluent in English, Russian, and French.

See also
 List of foreign ministers in 2017

References

External links

1964 births
Living people
Mongolian politicians
Harvard Law School alumni 
People from Sükhbaatar Province
Foreign ministers of Mongolia
Interior ministers of Mongolia
Justice ministers of Mongolia